Pedro V Ntivila a Nkanga was a ruler of the throne of the Kingdom of Kongo and a member of the Kimpanzu house. He ruled Kongo from 1763 to 1764, after he overthrew Sebastião I, when Pedro refused to relinquish the Kimpanzu claims to the throne. This overthrow resulted in the breakdown of the rotating houses system put in place by Pedro IV. His reign was short-lived, however, and after he was in turn overthrown by Álvaro XI, he was removed from the official records, evidenced by the ascension of the official Pedro V in 1859. It is most likely due to the fact that he claimed the throne at the same time as Álvaro IX, though he kept his claim on the throne even after his removal.

References

Manikongo of Kongo